"Immensité" (French for "Immensity") is the second single from Celine Dion's 2007 French-language album, D'elles. It premiered on the radio in France and Quebec on 23 April 2007 and was released as a music download on 6 May 2007. However, a physical single was not issued. The song was also released as a radio single in Belgium, in August 2007.

Background and release
"Immensité" was written by Nina Bouraoui and French composer Jacques Veneruso, who also produced the track. Veneruso already worked with Dion on her previous hits, including "Sous le vent," "Tout l'or des hommes" and "Je ne vous oublie pas" among others. Bouraoui wrote also other song featured on D'elles, called "Les paradis."

The music video was shot at the Lake Mead, on the 5 and 6 April 2007 and premiered on 14 May 2007.

Dion performed this song during the two TV specials dedicated to the issue of her album D'elles. She also performed it live on Sainte-Justine private benefit show on 4 August 2007.

Dion promoted "Immensité" seven months later, during her visit in France in November 2007 and included it on the "Taking Chances" French CD single released at that time. Dion also performed it on Star Academy, her European concerts in 2013, her 2016 tour, and her French concerts in 2017.

In April 2008, "Immensité" became a bonus track on the Taking Chances digital deluxe version.

Charts

Release history

References

Celine Dion songs
2007 singles
French-language songs
Songs written by Jacques Veneruso
Songs written by Nina Bouraoui
2007 songs
Epic Records singles
Columbia Records singles